Marta Rojas (May 17, 1928 – October 3, 2021) was a Cuban journalist, historian, historical fiction writer, and revolutionary heroine. A witness to the 26 July 1953 assault on the Moncada Barracks, she reported on the subject of censorship to Revista Bohemia.

Biography 
Marta Rojas, a tailor's daughter, was born in Santiago de Cuba, on 17 May 1928 (other sources state 1931). She studied at the Escuela Normal. Though she thought she wanted to be a physician, she changed her mind once she arrived in Havana, graduating from the Escuela Profesional de Periodismo Manuel Márquez Sterling.

Rojas worked for Revista Bohemia magazine, and after the revolution, also for Verde Olivo and Trabajo. She worked for the newspaper Granma since its founding, covering numerous national and international events (including numerous trips by Fidel Castro abroad). She also served as a war correspondent in Vietnam. Rojas wrote several novels dealing with the founding of the Cuban nation and the struggle of the mestizos since the 18th century. Turning to historical fiction, she has published several books, including Moncada, La Generación del Centenario, El juicio del Moncada, Tania la Guerrillera (coauthor) and El que debe vivir (testimonies about Abel Santamaría). In 1992 an extract translated by Jean Stubbs and Pedro Perez Sarduy from Rojas's (then unpublished) novel El columpio de Rey Spencer was included in the anthology Daughters of Africa, edited by Margaret Busby.

She died of a heart attack on 3 October 2021.

Awards and honours
Rojas has received numerous awards, such as Casa de las Americas Prize (1978), the José Martí National Journalism Award (1997), in recognition of her life's work; and the Premio Nacional de Periodismo (2015).

Selected works
 1960, Moncada : un juicio insolito
 1964, La generación del centenario en el Moncada
 1971, Tania, the unforgettable guerrilla
 1978, El que debe vivir
 1996, El columpio de Rey Spencer
2007: Holy Lust

References

Bibliography

1928 births
2021 deaths
Cuban journalists
People from Santiago de Cuba
Cuban women journalists
20th-century Cuban novelists
Cuban women novelists
Historical novelists
20th-century Cuban historians
20th-century Cuban women writers
Women historians